Namiq Əvəz oğlu Ələsgərov (born 3 February 1995) is an Azerbaijani professional footballer who plays as an attacking midfielder for Sabah and the Azerbaijan national team.

Career

Club
Ələsgərov is the product of the youth academy of FC Baku and made his debut for the senior team at the age of 17. During the summer of 2014, he transferred to Qarabağ. Despite a strong start, Ələsgərov suffered an injury in March 2015, leaving him out of the team until the end of 2015. In 2016, Namiq was loaned out to Kapaz. 

Ələsgərov left Qarabağ on 26 December 2016, signing for Neftçi PFK the following day. On 28 July 2020, Ələsgərov extended his contract with Neftçi until the summer of 2022.

The 2020-2021 season became a breakthrough season for Namiq Ələsgərov as he became the top goal scorer of the Azerbaijani Premier League with 19 goals in 26 matches and helped Neftçi win its first league title since 2013.

International
On 28 March 2015 Ələsgərov made his senior international debut for Azerbaijan game against Malta.

Career statistics

Club

International

Honours

Club
Baku
 Azerbaijan Cup: 2011–12
Qarabağ
 Azerbaijan Premier League: 2014–15
 Azerbaijan Cup: 2014–15

Neftçi
 Azerbaijan Premier League: 2020–21
Individual

 Azerbaijan Premier League top scorer: 2020–21

References

 

1995 births
Living people
Azerbaijani footballers
People from Qusar District
Association football midfielders
FC Baku players
Qarabağ FK players
Kapaz PFK players
Neftçi PFK players
Bursaspor footballers
Azerbaijan Premier League players
Azerbaijan youth international footballers
Azerbaijan under-21 international footballers
Azerbaijan international footballers
Azerbaijani expatriate sportspeople in Turkey